Glenn C. Arbery is an American academic and Catholic who is the president of Wyoming Catholic College. He is the author of the novels Boundaries of Eden and Bearings and Distances, and of the book Why Literature Matters.

He is the father of playwright Will Arbery.

References

Heads of universities and colleges in the United States
Living people
American Catholics
Year of birth missing (living people)
Place of birth missing (living people)